Charles Hartwell Bonesteel III (September 26, 1909 – October 13, 1977) was an American military commander, the son of Major General Charles Hartwell Bonesteel Jr. and grandson of Major Charles H. Bonesteel Sr. (1851–1902). He served in the United States Army during World War II and the Korean War. In the 1960s, he served as commander, United States Forces Korea during the Korean DMZ Conflict (1966–69).

Early life and education
Bonesteel (pronounced Bon-uh-stel) was born on September 26, 1909 in Plattsburgh, New York. As a teenager, he was an Eagle Scout and was awarded the Distinguished Eagle Scout Award by the Boy Scouts of America.

Career
 
A 1931 graduate of the United States Military Academy at West Point, Bonesteel received from his classmates the lifelong nickname of "Tick." After graduation, he was a Rhodes Scholar at the University of Oxford.

After carrying out a series of command and staff assignments, he served in the United States and Europe during World War II in a number of senior positions. With the surrender of Japan imminent, Bonesteel, General George A. Lincoln, and Colonel Dean Rusk of the Strategy Policy Committee at the Pentagon were tasked with drawing up General Order No. 1 to define the areas of responsibility for American, Soviet and Chinese forces. On August 10, 1945 with Soviet forces already moving through Manchuria into northern Korea, Bonesteel proposed the 38th parallel as the Division of Korea. The draft General Order was cabled to the Soviets on 15 August and accepted by them the following day.

In the postwar era, Bonesteel served as special assistant to the Secretary of State. In November 1958, in an official capacity, he visited the city of Saigon, Republic of Vietnam (South Vietnam).  He also served as commanding general of the 24th Infantry Division (1961–1962), and commanding general of the VII Corps (1962–1963).

Bonesteel served as the Commander of U.S. Forces Korea (and Commander-in-Chief, U.N. Command Korea; Commanding General, Eighth U.S. Army) from 1966 to 1969. During this period he defended against North Korean infiltration during the Korean DMZ Conflict (1966-1969) and dealt with tensions arising from the January 1968 Pueblo Incident.

Later life, death and funeral
Bonesteel retired from the U.S. Army in 1969, died on October 13, 1977 and is buried in Arlington National Cemetery near his father and grandfather.

Awards and decorations
 Distinguished Service Medal, twice (General Staff War Department, 1944–45; retirement, 1969)
 Legion of Merit, twice (Sicily, 1943; European Theater, 1943–44)
 Honorary Officer of the Order of the British Empire (United Kingdom)
 Croix de Guerre (France)
 Distinguished Eagle Scout Award

References

External links
Arlington National Cemetery: Charles Hartwell Bonesteel III 

1909 births
1977 deaths
American Rhodes Scholars
United States Army personnel of World War II
United States Army personnel of the Korean War
Burials at Arlington National Cemetery
Military personnel from New York City
Recipients of the Distinguished Service Medal (US Army)
Recipients of the Legion of Merit
Honorary Officers of the Order of the British Empire
Recipients of the Croix de Guerre 1939–1945 (France)
United States Military Academy alumni
United States Army generals
Commanders, United States Forces Korea